The Saxon is an armoured personnel carrier used by the British Army and supplied in small numbers to various overseas organisations. It was developed by GKN Sankey from earlier projects, AT 100 IS and AT104, and was due to be replaced by the Future Rapid Effect System.

History
The first operational Saxons were deployed in Germany in 1983, to equip mechanised infantry battalions. The Saxon has now been withdrawn from service in HM Armed Forces, but 147 are kept in storage. The Saxon has been deployed to places such as Bahrain, Brunei, Bosnia, Malaysia, Oman, Iraq and Afghanistan.

Seven Saxons were ordered by the Royal Hong Kong Police from GKN Sankey in 1987 and delivered in 1988 where they replaced 15 Saracens. They were assigned to the Police Tactical Unit and remained there until withdrawn in 2009. In the Balkans, Saxons were outfitted with turrets taken from FV432s to serve as improvised anti-sniper turret.

75 Saxons were sold to Ukraine reportedly under a contract made in 2013, i.e. predating the start of the Russo-Ukrainian War. The Ukrainian military announced the deal on 5 December 2014. The former chief commander of British land forces, Richard Dannatt, said that supplying the vehicles to Ukraine was "immoral" as they were "useless" in high intensity warfare. Before September 2015 another 200 were bought from one of europe's largest army surplus company.

In Ukrainian service, the type has seen combat against Russian forces during the 2022 Russian invasion of Ukraine. As of September 2022, available video and photographic evidence indicates Ukraine has lost at least 11 Saxons during the invasion, with 9 being captured by Russian forces and two being destroyed.

Design
The Saxon was intended to act as a cheap but efficient "battle-taxi" for units that would have to make long journeys from the UK to reinforce the British Army of the Rhine. It was made as a relatively low cost armoured personnel carrier based on a revised Bedford M series 4x4 truck chassis and other commercially available components.

As a lightly armoured wheeled vehicle, it is much faster - especially on roads - and easier to maintain than a tracked vehicle. It shares many parts with commercial trucks, reducing the operating cost. It is armoured against small-arms fire and shell splinters, but is not intended to stand up to any anti-vehicle weaponry. The vehicle has a single machine gun for local air defence.

The Saxon's hull is welded steel with a V-shaped under-chassis plate to deflect mine detonations. Seating is provided in the rear for up to ten troops, although eight is a more comfortable load if all their equipment is included. There is an equipment stowage area on the hull roof.

Some Saxon IS, or Saxon Patrol, vehicles were acquired for service in Northern Ireland, serving as ambulances or troop carriers, which had extendible wings that could be used as protective shields during a riot. Compared to the standard model, these have various minor modifications intended for internal security operations, such as searchlights and wire cutters.

Variants

The Saxon can be fitted out as:

 APC
 Command Vehicle
 Incident Control vehicle
 ARV
 Saxon Patrol
 LHD converted Saxons by KADDB in Jordan

Operators

Current operators

 : 28 delivered in 2015
 : 4 second-hand vehicles delivered in 2016 for use with MINUSMA
: 4+
: Iraqi Armed Forces now mostly used by police.
: 12 second-hand vehicles delivered to Jordanian Army, modernized by KADDB to change steering wheel position from right to left with newer engines and gearbox with a working model shown in SOFEX 2010.

: 4 second-hand vehicles delivered in 2016 via France for United Nations operation in the Central African Republic.
: 25 delivered in 2013

: At least 10 were captured during the 2022 invasion of Ukraine. Some were displayed at the International Military-Technical Forum «ARMY-2022».
: 1 Saxon seized from UN peacekeepers in the civil war in Bosnia and Herzegovina, still in service.
: 50 donated second hand by Djibouti April 2013.
: Ukraine's Ministry of Defense has purchased 75 second-hand vehicles, which have been delivered in two shipments in 2015.

Former Operators
: Hong Kong Police Force Police Tactical Unit. All retired in 2009 and replaced by Unimog U5000s.
: British Army. All taken out from service.

References

Bibliography
Armed Forces of the United Kingdom, Charles Heyman. Leo Cooper, 2003.

Armoured personnel carriers of the United Kingdom
Internal security vehicles
Military vehicles introduced in the 1980s
Armoured personnel carriers of the Cold War
Wheeled armoured personnel carriers